The 1956 Winter Olympics, officially known by the International Olympic Committee (IOC) as the VII Olympic Winter Games, were a winter multi-sport event held in Cortina d'Ampezzo, Italy, from 26 January to 5 February 1956.  A total of 821 athletes representing 32 National Olympic Committees (NOCs) participated in these Games in 24 events across 8 disciplines.  The Olympic program was similar to four years prior, with two new cross-country events added to the competition.  Both men and women competed at these Games, though women only contested events in alpine skiing, figure skating, and cross-country skiing.   The Soviet Union attempted to secure the inclusion of a women's speed skating event, but this was rejected by the IOC at its 49th session in Athens in 1954. Women would compete in speed skating four years later at the 1960 Squaw Valley Olympics.

A total of 131 athletes won medals in Cortina d'Ampezzo.  In their Winter Olympic debut, athletes from the Soviet Union won sixteen medals, seven of which were gold.  Both medal totals were the most of any NOC at the Games.  Two of these seven medals were earned in a single event, the 1500 meters speed skating competition, when two Soviet skaters tied for first place in a world record time. Athletes from Austria and Sweden won the second and third most medals, with 11 and 10 respectively. Of the 32 NOCs that competed in Cortina d'Ampezzo, 13 won at least one medal.  Host nation Italy won three medals, all in bobsleigh.

Cross-country skier Sixten Jernberg of Sweden won four medals, and Austrian Toni Sailer won three gold medals in alpine skiing, both of which were the most of any athlete in Cortina d'Ampezzo. Tenley Albright improved on her silver medal from four years prior in Oslo to win the gold medal in ladies figure skating.  The Soviet Union won six medals—exactly half of the medals awarded—in speed skating, with two each being won by Yevgeny Grishin and Oleg Goncharenko.  Grishin would repeat his performance with golds in the same two events four years later in Squaw Valley.

Alpine skiing

Bobsleigh

Cross-country skiing

Figure skating

Ice hockey

Nordic combined

Ski jumping

Speed skating

Multiple medalists

Athletes who won multiple medals during the 1956 Winter Olympics are listed below.

Note
 No silver medal was awarded in this event because Grishin and Mikhaylov tied for first place with a world record time of 2:08.6.

See also
1956 Winter Olympics medal table

References

External links

 

Medal winners
Lists of Winter Olympic medalists by year
Italy sport-related lists